The Manic World Tour was the third headlining concert tour by American singer Halsey, in support of her third studio album, Manic (2020). The tour started in Madrid, Spain on February 6, 2020, and ended in Manchester, England on March 12, 2020, before the COVID-19 pandemic ended the tour abruptly before summer North American and May eastern Asia dates could be played. Originally, Halsey said it would be her last tour for "a very long time". The North American leg was originally scheduled to take place in summer 2020, but due to the pandemic, Halsey later announced that she had rescheduled the North American leg to summer 2021.

On January 22, 2021, Halsey announced the remainder of the tour was cancelled, due to continued uncertainty over the pandemic, days before the announcement for her pregnancy.

Setlist 
This setlist is from the show on February 9, 2020, in Frankfurt. It is not intended to represent all concerts for the tour.

 "Nightmare"
 "Castle"
 "Heaven In Hiding"
 "Eyes Closed" / "Die for Me"
 "You Should Be Sad"
 "Haunting"
 "Forever... (is a Long Time)"
 "Dominic's Interlude"
 "I Hate Everybody"
 "Colors pt. II"
 "Colors"
 "Walls Could Talk"
 "Bad At Love"
 "3AM"
 "Finally // Beautiful Stranger"
 "100 Letters" 
 "Is There Somewhere"
 "Killing Boys"
 "Hold Me Down"
 "Clementine"
 "Graveyard"
 "929"
Encore
 "Ashley"
 "Gasoline"
 "Without Me"

Notes
 Starting on March 7, "Experiment On Me" was added to the setlist.

Tour dates

Cancelled shows

Notes

References

Halsey (singer) concert tours
2020 concert tours
Concert tours cancelled due to the COVID-19 pandemic